Dimitrios Karadolamis (alternate spelling: Dimitris) (Greek: Δημήτρης Καραδολάμης, born August 15, 1987) is a Greek professional basketball player. At a height of 2.04 m (6'8 ") tall, he can play at either the small forward or power forward position.

Professional career
Karadolamis played with Aris in the EuroLeague, during the EuroLeague 2007–08 season. He was the Greek All-Star Game's 3-Point Shootout Champion in 2009.

National team career
Karadolamis played with the Greek under-26 national team at the 2009 Mediterranean Games tournament, where he won a silver medal.

References

External links
Euroleague.net Profile
FIBA Europe Profile
Eurobasket.com Profile
Draftexpress.com Profile
Hellenic Federation Profile 

1987 births
Living people
A.E.L. 1964 B.C. players
Aris B.C. players
Arkadikos B.C. players
Competitors at the 2009 Mediterranean Games
Doxa Lefkadas B.C. players
Greek Basket League players
Greek men's basketball players
Irakleio B.C. players
Koropi B.C. players
Makedonikos B.C. players
Mediterranean Games medalists in basketball
Mediterranean Games silver medalists for Greece
OFI Crete B.C. players
Small forwards
Power forwards (basketball)
Sportspeople from Giannitsa